The Kirkwood Formation is a geological formation found in the Eastern and Western Cape provinces in South Africa. It is one of the four formations found within the Uitenhage Group of the Algoa Basin – its type locality – and in the neighbouring Gamtoos Basin. Outcrops of the Kirkwood are also found along the Worcester-Pletmos, Herbertsdale-Riversdale, Heidelberg-Mossel Bay, and Oudtshoorn-Gamtoos basin lines. At these basins the Kirkwood Formation underlies the Buffelskloof Formation and not the Sundays River Formation.

Geology 
The Kirwood Formation was formed along the southern section of South Africa during the break up of Gondwana. Dating it has proven tricky, with some regarding it as a Late Jurassic (~145 Ma) or Early Cretaceous deposit (~135 Ma). However, dating the Kirkwood's abundant volcanic ash layers by U-Pb methods is currently underway.

The Kirkwood Formation is composed of sedimentary rocks deposited under fluvial conditions at or near sea level, such as variegated mudstone (an iconic feature), medium-grained lithic sandstone (often being charcoal-rich), and sporadic conglomerates. At its base, the Kirkwood Formation includes a significant deposit of fine-to-medium grained, poorly-sorted (often quartzitic) estuarine sandstone with subordinate dark grey to brow shale layers. This deposit was described as the Swartkops Member. The lower portion of the remainder of the Formation is composed predominantly of siltstones, but includes a smaller sandstone layer (described as part of the Bethelsdorp Member). The upper portion of the Formation is composed predominantly of fine, clay-rich mudstones, with multiple smaller layers of estuarine sandstone.

The Kirkwood is the second formation of the Uitenhage Group, positioned between the overlying Sundays River Formation and the underlying Enon Formation. Only three geological members have been described within it: the Swartkops Member which contains estuarine sandstone deposits and lacks fossils. The Colchester Member is the most fossil-rich containing terrestrial and lacustrine fossils and is composed of dark grey shale, siltstones and sandstones. The third, the Bethelsdorp Member, resembles the Colchester in containing dark-grey shales and sandstone, and contains marine microfossils. The upper section of the member is overlain by mudstone and siltstone.

Paleontology 
The Kirkwood Formation is the most fossil-rich formation of Late Jurassic - Early Cretaceous age known in South Africa. It has yielded disarticulated remains of theropod and ornithopod dinosaurs, and several sauropod species in which the Kirkwood is particularly rich, and includes indeterminate members of Diplodocidae, Dicraeosauridae and Brachiosauridae, as well as Algoasaurus, a eusauropod of uncertain affinities. A partial skull and teeth of a stegosaur, Paranthodon, has also been discovered.  In addition to Paranthodon, an ankylosaur vertebra has also been described. Fossils belonging to a dryosaurid ornithopod were unearthed in three expeditions between 1995 and 1999. In 2022, these remains were described as a new genus and species, Iyuku raathi. Iyuku is primarily known from remains belonging to hatchling and juvenile individuals. Indeterminate members of Rhynchocephalia and Squamata have also been discovered. Mesozoic-aged amber has also been recovered from the Kirkwood. The most well-known find from the Kirkwood is Nqwebasaurus, a basal ornithomimosaur. Fragmentary remains of various reptile, frog, insect, and mammal fossils have also been found, including fish scales and freshwater bivalves. In addition several plant species such as bryophytes, ferns, conifers, cycads, and bennettitaleans have been discovered, including silicified fossil tree trunks in the sandstone sections which show evidence of being burned.

References 

Geologic formations of South Africa
Lower Cretaceous Series of Africa
Cretaceous South Africa
Berriasian Stage
Hauterivian Stage
Valanginian Stage
Sandstone formations
Shale formations
Mudstone formations
Siltstone formations
Fluvial deposits